Energy in Afghanistan is provided by hydropower followed by fossil fuel and solar power. Currently, less than 50% of Afghanistan's population has access to electricity. This covers the major cities in the country. Many rural areas do not have access to adequate electricity but this should change after the major CASA-1000 project is completed.

Afghanistan currently generates over 600 megawatts (MW) of electricity from its several hydroelectric plants as well as using fossil fuel and solar panels. Over 670 MW more is imported from neighboring Iran, Tajikistan, Turkmenistan and Uzbekistan.

Due to the large influx of expats from neighboring Pakistan and Iran, Afghanistan may require as much as 7,000 MW of electricity in the coming years. The Afghan National Development Strategy has identified alternative energy, such as wind and solar energy, as a high value power source to develop. As a result, a number of solar and wind farms have been established, with more currently under development.

Hydroelectricity

Afghanistan has the potential to produce over 23,000 MW of hydroelectricity. The Afghan government continues to seek technical assistance from neighboring and regional countries to build more dams. A number of dams with hydroelectric power stations were built between the 1950s and the mid-1970s, which included the Kajaki in the Kajaki District of Helmand Province and the Naghlu in the Sarobi District of Kabul Province. The Kajaki provides up to 151 MW of electricity to both Helmand and Kandahar provinces. The power station at the Kamal Khan Dam provides electricity to residents of Nimruz Province.

Residents of Kabul, Kapisa and Nangarhar provinces receive electricity from the Naghlu plant. Kunduz residents receive it from the local Nahr Gawkush power station. Residents of Badakhshan Province are connected to the Shorabak power plant in the Fayzabad District.

The power plant at the Salma Dam (Afghanistan-India Friendship Dam) provides up to 42 MW of electricity to residents of Herat Province. A number of other water dams are being built in different parts of the country so that more people have access to basic electricity.

Residents of small cities or towns in the central provinces continue to build small dams for water storage and production of electricity. Recently some Chinese experts and entrepreneurs found interest in helping Afghanistan with these projects.

Imported electricity 

Afghanistan currently imports over 670 MW of electricity from neighboring Iran, Tajikistan, Turkmenistan and Uzbekistan. This costs Afghanistan between $250 and $280 million annually.

Iran
Afghanistan's western provinces have long purchased electricity from eastern Iran.

Tajikistan
Afghanistan purchases as much as 150 MW of electricity from Tajikistan. After completion, the billion dollar CASA-1000 project will provide 300 MW of electricity to Afghanistan, with the remaining 1000 MW going to Pakistan.

Turkmenistan
Provinces in northwestern Afghanistan purchase electricity from Turkmenistan.

Uzbekistan
Afghanistan purchases as much as 450 MW of electricity from Uzbekistan. It runs from Kabul through five Afghan provinces towards the country's border with Uzbekistan, and connects to the Uzbek electricity transmission system. By 2009 residents of Kabul were enjoying 24-hour electricity.

Crude oil and natural gas

Afghanistan imports petroleum products and natural gas from neighboring Uzbekistan, Turkmenistan and Iran. Russia has also decided to join these countries. Meanwhile, work on the Turkmenistan–Afghanistan–Pakistan–India Pipeline of natural gas is also ongoing.

Afghanistan has oil fields in the northern provinces of Sar-e Pol, Jowzjan and Faryab. They contain about 1.9 billion barrels of crude oil. Afghanistan also has 15.6 billion cubic feet of natural gas. Small amount of crude oil and natural gas is produced at the Angot field in the province of Sar-e Pol. Another small oil and gas field at Zomrad Sai near Sheberghan was reportedly undergoing repairs in mid-2001.

Coal 

Afghanistan is reported to have 73 million tonnes of proven coal reserves. The coal mines are located from Badakhshan and extend up to Herat Province. According to TOLOnews, China is considering investment in Afghanistan's coal mining. The investment is said to generate up to 500 MW of electricity. The country has more than 11 coal reserves which include the following:

Bamyan province 
 Ashposhta and Sarasia coal reserves - 150 million tons
 Sarjungel and Sar Asia coal reserves

Baghlan province  
 Karkar coal reserves
 Dodkash coal reserves

Samangan province 
 Dara e sof-Shabashak reserves (Very High Quality) 74 million tons
 Darae e sof- Gola badri - Keshine Mabayen Village and Balkhab District coal reserves

Badakhshan province 
 Kotal khaki - Barf District coal reserves

Parwan province 
 Farakort Gorband Province and Gawoparan Surkhparsa District coal reserves

Herat province 
 Karukh coal reserves - 15 million tons

Daikundi province 
 Lagharjoe - Kacharan District coal reserves

Uruzgan province 
 Kandalan Village Mudakhil District coal reserves

Paktia province
 Khost and Paktia coal reserves - 75 million tons

Solar and wind farms 

Afghanistan has the potential to produce over 222,000 MW of electricity by using solar panels. The use of solar power is becoming widespread in Afghanistan. Solar parks have been established in a number of cities. Solar-powered street lights are seen in all Afghan cities and towns. Many villagers in rural parts of the country are also buying solar panels and using them.

The country also has the potential to produce over 66,000 MW of electricity by installing and using wind turbines. The first wind farm was successfully completed in Panjshir Province in 2008, which has the potential to produce 100 kW of power. The United States Agency for International Development (USAID) has teamed up with the National Renewable Energy Laboratory to develop a wind map of Herat province. They have identified approximately 158,000 MW of potential wind power. Installing wind turbine farms in Herat could provide electricity to most of western Afghanistan. Smaller projects are wind pumps that already have been attached to water wells in several Herat villages, along with reservoirs for storing up to 15 cubic meters of water. The 300 KW wind farm in Herat was inaugurated in September 2017.

Biomass and biogas 
Besides wind and sun, potential alternative energy sources for Afghanistan include biomass, biogas, and geothermal energy. Biogas plants are fueled by animal dung, and produce a clean, odourless and smokeless fuel. The digestion process also creates a high-quality fertilizer which can benefit the family farm.

Family-sized biogas plants require 50 kilograms of manure per day to support the average family. Four to six cows are required to produce this amount of manure, or eight to nine camels, or 50 sheep/goats. Theoretically, Afghanistan has the potential to produce about 1,400 million cubic meters of biogas annually. A quarter of this amount could meet half of Afghanistan's energy needs, according to a January 2011 report from the United States National Renewable Energy Laboratory.

Lithium and uranium 
Afghanistan has large amounts of lithium and uranium reserves.

Geothermal 
An area of vast untapped potential lies in the heat energy locked inside the earth in the form of magma or dry, hot rocks. Geothermal energy for electricity generation has been used worldwide for nearly 100 years. The technology currently exists to provide low-cost electricity from Afghanistan's geothermal resources, which are located in the main axis areas of the Hindu Kush. These run along the Herat fault system, all the way from Herat to the Wakhan District of Badakhshan Province in Afghanistan.

With efficient use of the natural resources already abundantly available in Afghanistan, alternative energy sources could be directed into industrial use, supply the energy needs of the nation and build economic self-sufficiency.

See also

List of power stations in Afghanistan
Renewable energy in Afghanistan

References

External links 

Afghanistan Inter-ministerial Commission for Energy
Energy profile of Afghanistan